Opochka is a town and the administrative center of Opochetsky District in Pskov Oblast, Russia, located on the Velikaya River,  south of Pskov, the administrative center of the oblast. Population: ; 9,902 (2019 estimate).

History

It was founded in 1414. At the time, it was a fortress subordinate to Pskov and protecting it from the south. In 1426, it was besieged by the Lithuanians, and in 1427 by Germans, but it was not conquered. It did, however, burn down in 1441. In 1510, the town was annexed by the Grand Duchy of Moscow, and from 1547 it was part of the Tsardom of Russia. In 1581, it was captured by Polish King Stephen Báthory.

In the course of the administrative reform carried out in 1708 by Peter the Great, it was included into Ingermanland Governorate (known since 1710 as Saint Petersburg Governorate). Opochka is specifically mentioned as one of the towns making the governorate. In 1727, separate Novgorod Governorate was split off, and in 1772, Pskov Governorate (which between 1777 and 1796 existed as Pskov Viceroyalty) was established. Between 1772 and 1776, Opochka was the seat of the governorate. In 1776, the borders of the governorate were considerably altered, the seat was relocated to Pskov, and Opochka became the seat of Opochetsky Uyezd. In the late 19th century, the town had ten industrial plants, including tanneries. Trade in linen, hides and grain was conducted.

On August 1, 1927, the uyezds and governorates were abolished and Opochetsky District, with the administrative center in Opochka, was established as a part of Pskov Okrug of Leningrad Oblast. It included parts of former Opochetsky and Sebezhsky Uyezds. On July 23, 1930, the okrugs were also abolished and the districts were directly subordinated to the oblast. On January 29, 1935, the district was transferred to Kalinin Oblast, and on February 5, Opochetsky District became a part of Velikiye Luki Okrug of Kalinin Oblast, one of the okrugs abutting the state boundaries of the Soviet Union. On May 11, 1937, Opochka Okrug with the administrative center in Opochka was established and the district was transferred to the okrug. On February 5, 1941, the okrug was abolished. Between July 8, 1941 and July 15, 1944, Opochka was occupied by German troops. The Germans operated a Sicherheitsdienst camp in the town. On August 22, 1944, the district was transferred to newly established Velikiye Luki Oblast. On October 2, 1957, Velikiye Luki Oblast was abolished and Opochetsky District was transferred to Pskov Oblast.

Administrative and municipal status
Within the framework of administrative divisions, Opochka serves as the administrative center of Opochetsky District, to which it is directly subordinated. As a municipal division, the town of Opochka is incorporated within Opochetsky Municipal District as Opochka Urban Settlement.

Economy

Industry
There are enterprises of food and textile industries in Opochka.

Transportation

The M20 Highway, which connects St. Petersburg and Vitebsk via Pskov, passes Opochka. Another road connects Opochka with Sebezh. There are also local roads.

Culture and recreation
Opochka contains five cultural heritage monuments of federal significance and additionally thirty-four objects classified as cultural and historical heritage of local significance. The federally protected monuments are the Intercession Church, the postal station, the Kukolkin House, and the Chernyshyov House, as well as an archeological site.

Notable people
 
 
Opochka is the birthplace of architect Lev Rudnev and geologist Nikolai Kudryavtsev.
Sergey Yustinovich Bagotsky (1879-1953), Russian Marxist revolutionary, Soviet medicine and Red Cross diplomat

References

Notes

Sources

Архивный отдел Псковского облисполкома. Государственный архив Псковской области. "Административно-территориальное деление Псковской области (1917–1988 гг.). Справочник". (Administrative-Territorial Structure of Pskov Oblast (1917–1988). Reference.) Книга I. Лениздат, 1988.

Cities and towns in Pskov Oblast
Opochetsky Uyezd
Opochetsky District